Juked is an American literary magazine established in 1999 by J. W. Wang (Los Angeles). Print editions have been published yearly since 2003. Notable contributors include Blake Butler, Tao Lin, Jared Hegwood, Karin Lewicki, Woody Evans, Stephen Graham Jones, Kim Chinquee, Ashley Farmer, Jackson Bliss, Claudia Smith, and others. "Moment" is a photo-essay feature of Juked.

Recognition
Stories and essays published in Juked have been anthologized in W. W. Norton & Company's New Sudden Fiction, Best New Poets, Dzanc Books' Best of the Web, and elsewhere.

See also
 List of literary magazines

References

External links
 

Annual magazines published in the United States
Poetry magazines published in the United States
Magazines established in 1999
Magazines published in Los Angeles
1999 establishments in California